The Robert Russa Moton Boyhood Home, also known as Pleasant Shade, is a historic plantation near Rice in rural Prince Edward County, Virginia.  The  acre plantation was the childhood home of African-American educator Robert Russa Moton between 1869 and 1880.  The kitchen housing area where Moton lived is also believed to incorporate one of the county's oldest buildings, dating to about 1746.  The plantation was also the scene of fighting during the American Civil War, in the later stages of the Battle of Sailor's Creek of April 6, 1865.

The property was listed on the National Register of Historic Places in 2014.

See also
National Register of Historic Places listings in Prince Edward County, Virginia

References

Houses on the National Register of Historic Places in Virginia
Houses completed in 1746
Houses in Prince Edward County, Virginia
National Register of Historic Places in Prince Edward County, Virginia